UN Member States are currently negotiating a legally-binding, international agreement on plastics that will address the entire life cycle of plastics, from design to production and disposal. On March 2, 2022 UN Member States voted at the resumed fifth UN Environment Assembly (UNEA-5.2) to establish an Intergovernmental Negotiating Committee (INC) with the mandate of advancing a legally-binding international agreement on plastics. The resolution is entitled “End plastic pollution: Towards an international legally binding instrument.”

Timeline 
Following UNEA-5.2, The mandate specifies that the INC must begin its work by the end of 2022 with the goal of "completing a draft global legally binding agreement by the end of 2024."

Work towards the treaty began with the meeting of an Ad Hoc Open-Ended Working Group (OEWG) in Dakar, Senegal from May 30 through June 1, 2022.  During that meeting, Member States established a timeline for subsequent meetings through the end of 2024, rules of procedure, and the initial scope of work for the first meeting of the INC.

INC-1 is scheduled to take place in Punta del Este, Uruguay from November 28, 2022 through December 2, 2022. The agenda is expected to contain items including the formal adoption of the rules of procedure.

Content 
Members agreed that the treaty will be international in scope, legally-binding, and should address the full life cycle of plastics, including its design, production, and disposal. It has been argued that chemicals contained in plastics such as additives, processing aids, and nonintentionally added substances need to be addressed, too.

Support for the treaty 
In the lead-up to UNEA-5.2, the majority of UN Member States had expressed their support for advancing a global treaty. Other groups making public declarations about the need for a treaty include the business sector, civil society, Indigenous Peoples, workers, trade unions, and scientists.

References

External links
 Resolution adopted by the United Nations Environment Assembly on 2 March 2022 – 5/14. End plastic pollution: towards an international legally binding instrument

United Nations resolutions
Plastics and the environment
Pollution
Proposed treaties